The Volvo XC40 is a subcompact luxury crossover SUV manufactured by Volvo Cars. It was unveiled on 21 September 2017 as the smallest SUV model from Volvo, below the XC60. Orders started in September of 2017, and manufacturing began in November 2017. It was introduced with conventional petrol and diesel engines, with a plug-in hybrid model being introduced in 2019, and a battery electric vehicle model was released in 2020 as the XC40 Recharge. A version of the battery electric model with a sloping rear roof was released in 2021 as the C40 Recharge.

The XC40 was given the European Car of the Year Award at the 2018 Geneva Motor Show. and the car was named Car of the Year Japan for 2018/2019.

Overview
The design of the XC40 was previewed by concept car called the Concept 40.1, which was designed by Thomas Ingenlath, and unveiled in May 2016.[1]

The XC40 is the first Volvo to be based on the CMA platform, to be shared by other compact Volvos, Geely, and Lynk & Co model. The platform was designed to maximise interior space.

The XC40 features front-wheel drive and all-wheel drive and comes powered by Volvo's 1.5-litre three cylinder and existing 2.0-litre four-cylinder engines, in both diesel and petrol variants. From 2019, a FWD plug-in hybrid named "T5 Twin Engine" is available, combining a  petrol version of the 1.5-litre engine with an  electric motor. In the United States, engine choices are limited to the 2.0-litre four-cylinder petrol powered T4 and T5 models.

Volvo Intellisafe is installed as standard. This technology is designed with the intention of preventing runoff road accidents. By using the car's advanced sensory system, the technology can detect potentially fatal scenarios such as run off road protection. Safety belts are also capable of being automatically adjusted throughout these moments of impact while energy absorbing seat frames and seats are in place to prevent spine injuries. This technology was created based on real life data, and various crash test track methods such as: ditch, airborne and rough terrains.

The XC40 was given the European Car of the Year Award at the 2018 Geneva Motor Show. and the car was named Car of the Year Japan for 2018/2019. The XC40 was awarded Car of the Year by the magazine What Car? in January 2018, also Carsales Car of the Year in 2018, and Irish Car of the Year in 2019. The company increased their production across 2018 to 2019 to meet global demand.

XC40 Recharge Pure Electric 
The XC40 Recharge Pure Electric is Volvo's first battery electric model, which was revealed on 16 October 2019. It is powered by a 78 kWh battery pack.

It went on sale in late 2020, with limited quantities available in select markets. Volvo announced that after the XC40 Recharge, it plans to "launch one new electric vehicle every year, and pledges to make half its lineup fully electric by 2025."

In 2023, the single motor version was revised by adopting the rear-wheel drive layout instead of front-wheel drive. It is the first rear-wheel-drive variant of a Volvo vehicle in 25 years. The revised version received a new motor, resulting in improved range and efficiency.

C40 Recharge 
The C40 Recharge is a derivative of the XC40 Recharge, which was released on 2 March 2021. It officially commenced production in September 2021. It is also the first Volvo nameplate that is only available as a battery electric vehicle.

The model shared the front end, front doors and interior design as the conventional XC40. The main difference between the XC40 and the C40 is the roofline, with the C40 having a coupe-style sloping roofline.

The C40's electric drivetrain is nearly identical to the battery electric XC40 Recharge.

Similar to the XC40 Recharge Pure Electric, the C40 received a revised version with rear-wheel drive instead of front-wheel drive for the single motor version.

Powertrain

Safety

XC40 Recharge

Sales

Awards and recognition 
European Car of the Year 2018
Car of the Year Japan for 2018/2019
Continental Irish Car of the Year 2019
Carsales Car of the Year in 2018
Women’s World Car of the Year 2018
What Car? Car of the Year 2018
What Car? Family SUV of the Year 2021 (for the Volvo XC40 T3 R-Design auto). The magazine awarded the XC40 five stars out of five in its review of the car.
Wheels Car of the Year 2019

References

Notes

External links 

 
 Official website (C40)

XC40
Luxury crossover sport utility vehicles
Front-wheel-drive vehicles
Plug-in hybrid vehicles
Production electric cars
Cars introduced in 2017